Scopula herbuloti is a moth in the family Geometridae. Endemic to Madagascar, it was described by Pierre Viette in 1977.

References

Moths described in 1977
herbuloti
Moths of Africa
Moths of Madagascar
Taxa named by Pierre Viette